Caloptilia sachalinella is a moth of the family Gracillariidae. It is known from the Russian Far East.

The larvae feed on Alnus hirsuta. They mine the leaves of their host plant.

References

sachalinella
Moths of Asia